Shalheh-ye Emam Hasan (also Romanized as Shalḩeh-ye Emām Ḩasan) is a village in Shalahi Rural District, in the Central District of Abadan County, Khuzestan Province, Iran. At the 2006 census, its population was 831, in 148 families.

References 

Populated places in Abadan County